is a railway station in San'yō-Onoda, Yamaguchi, Japan, operated by West Japan Railway Company (JR West).

Lines
Asa Station is served by the Sanyō Shinkansen and Sanyō Main Line, and also forms the terminus of the Mine Line.

Station layout
The station has seven regular tracks (for the Sanyō Main Line and Mine Line) and two Shinkansen tracks.

Platforms

History
The station opened on 3 December 1900. The Sanyō Shinkansen station opened on 13 March 1999.

References

External links

 JR West station information 

Railway stations in Japan opened in 1900
Sanyō Main Line
Sanyō Shinkansen
Railway stations in Yamaguchi Prefecture
Stations of West Japan Railway Company